Cristian Riggio (born 4 June 1996) is an Italian footballer who plays as a defender for  club Viterbese.

Career
He made his Serie C debut for Akragas on 28 August 2016 in a game against Vibonese.

After playing for Catanzaro on loan in the 2017–18 season, he joined the club on a permanent basis on 20 July 2018, signing a 2-year contract.

On 6 January 2021, he joined Monopoli on loan with an obligation to buy at the end of the 2020–21 season.

On 8 January 2022, he moved to Fidelis Andria.

On 6 August 2022, Riggio signed with Viterbese.

References

External links
 
 

1996 births
Living people
People from Crotone
Sportspeople from the Province of Crotone
Footballers from Calabria
Italian footballers
Association football defenders
Serie C players
F.C. Crotone players
S.S. Akragas Città dei Templi players
U.S. Catanzaro 1929 players
S.S. Monopoli 1966 players
S.S. Fidelis Andria 1928 players
U.S. Viterbese 1908 players